Floats (also called pontoons) are airtight hollow structures, similar to pressure vessels, designed to provide buoyancy in water.  Their principal applications are in watercraft hulls, aircraft floats, floating pier, pontoon rhinos, pontoon causeways, and marine engineering applications such as salvage.

During World War II the United States Navy Civil Engineer Corps developed a modular steel box (pontoon) for the Seabees to use.  It was an industrial sized Lego system of pre-drilled pre-cut angle iron and steel plate that could be assembled anywhere for which they became famous.  They used them to facilitate amphibious landings.  With the pontoons Seabees assembled docks, causeways, and rhinos to whatever size needed.  They allowed landings on Sicily where no one thought possible.  They ferried Patton across the Rhine and put the Marines ashore on Okinawa.  They would be used during the Korean War in the landing at Inchon in 1950 and again in Lebanon during the 1958 Lebanon crisis. 

Various objects that make use of floats are often referred to synecdochically as pontoons.

Applications

Floats make up the multipart hulls of catamarans and trimarans and provide buoyancy for floatplanes, seaplanes and houseboats. They are used in pontoon bridges, floating piers, and floats anchored to the seabed for recreation or dockage.  They are also used in shipbuilding and marine salvage, often deployed uninflated then pressurized to raise a sunken object. In military, floats are used as pontoon bridges or transportation platforms for heavier vehicles or machinery.

In popular usage, the term pontoon can refer to any of several of the following objects that make use of nautical floats.

Pontoon boat

A pontoon boat is a flattish boat that relies on nautical floats for buoyancy. Common boat designs are a catamaran with two pontoons, or a trimaran with three. In many parts of the world, pontoon boats are used as small vehicle ferries to cross rivers and lakes.

Anchored recreational platform
Raft-like platforms used for diving and other recreational activities are sometimes anchored at beaches and lake shores, often seasonally. Such platforms may be supported by foam-filled plastic floats or air-filled pontoons, and are known simply as "pontoons" in Australia and New Zealand. They may also be called swim floats.

Floating dock

A floating dock, floating pier or floating jetty consists of a platform or ramp supported by nautical floats. It is sometimes joined to the shore with a gangway but can be laid out the whole way from the shore to the end. This type of pier maintains a fixed vertical relationship to watercraft secured to it.

Pontoon bridge

A pontoon bridge (also known as a ponton bridge or floating bridge) uses floats or shallow-draft boats to support a continuous deck for pedestrian and vehicle travel. Most, but not all, pontoon bridges are temporary, used in wartime and civil emergencies. Seattle in the US and Kelowna in British Columbia, Canada are two places with permanent pontoon bridges, see William R. Bennett Bridge in British Columbia and these in Seattle: Lacey V. Murrow Memorial Bridge, Evergreen Point Floating Bridge and Homer M. Hadley Memorial Bridge.

Floatplane

A floatplane (float plane or pontoon plane) is a type of seaplane with one or more slender pontoons mounted under the fuselage to provide buoyancy.

Construction
Pontoons for marine industrial uses are usually fabricated from steel. Pontoons as parts of watercraft and aircraft are more typically molded in glass-reinforced plastic. Other techniques include those of traditional wooden boatbuilding as well as plywood over wooden ribs or metal sheets over metal ribs (aluminium or steel), reflecting the prevailing practice in aircraft and boats. In most cases, the decking surface on top of the pontoon is made from glass-reinforced plastic (GRP) or composite lumber. 
In model building, floats can easily be carved out of solid blocks or laminated sheets of foam.

Gallery

See also
Buoy
Caisson (lock gate)
Navy lighterage pontoons
Outrigger
Raft
Semi-submersible platform

References

Buoyancy devices